Anil Dutt (born 31 October 1916) was an Indian cricketer. He played one first-class match for Bengal in 1939/40.

See also
 List of Bengal cricketers

References

External links
 

1916 births
Year of death missing
Indian cricketers
Bengal cricketers
Cricketers from Kolkata